Changling may refer to:

People
 Changling (Qing dynasty), (1758–1838) Qing dynasty official of Mongol descent
 He Changling (1785–1848), Chinese scholar and official of the Qing dynasty
 Wang Changling (698–755), major Tang dynasty poet
 Yang Changling (born 1965), Chinese wrestler
 Zhao Changling or Zulfiya Chinshanlo (born 1993), Kazakh weight lifter

Places in China
 Changling County (长岭县), Jilin
 Changling, Yueyang (长岭街道), a subdistrict in Yunxi District, Yueyang, Hunan
 Changling Township, Henan (长陵乡), in Xi County

Towns
Changling, Wangjiang County, Anhui; see Wangjiang County
Changling, Chongqing, in Wanzhou District
Changling, Hubei, in Guangshui
Changling, Jilin, in Changling County
Changling, Liaoning, in Zhuanghe
Changling, Shandong, in Ju County

Other uses
 Changling Rinpoche, a Tibetan Buddhist lineage
 Zhu Changling, a character in The Heaven Sword and Dragon Saber

See also
Changeling (disambiguation)